Leonid Andreevich Pastur (born 21 August 1937) is a Ukrainian mathematical physicist and theoretical physicist, known in particular for contributions to random matrix theory, the spectral theory of random Schrödinger operators, statistical mechanics, and solid state physics (especially, the theory of disordered systems).  Currently, he heads the Department of Theoretical Physics at the B Verkin Institute for Low Temperature Physics and Engineering.

Work
 In random matrix theory: together with Vladimir Marchenko, he discovered the Marchenko–Pastur law. Later, he devised a more general approach to study random matrices with independent entries in the global regime. Together with Mariya Shcherbina, he found the first rigorous proof of universality for invariant matrix ensembles.
 In the spectral theory of random Schrödinger operators, he introduced the class of metrically transitive operators, and discovered several fundamental properties of this class. Together with Ilya Goldsheid and Stanislav Molchanov, he established Anderson localization for a class of one-dimensional self-adjoint operators with random potentials; this was the first mathematically rigorous proof of Anderson localization.

Awards and honors
He is a member of the National Academy of Sciences of Ukraine.  In 2012 he became a fellow of the American Mathematical Society.

References

Mathematical physicists
Theoretical physicists
Members of the National Academy of Sciences of Ukraine
Fellows of the American Mathematical Society
20th-century Ukrainian mathematicians
20th-century Ukrainian physicists
1937 births
Living people
21st-century Ukrainian physicists